Mester de juglaría ("Ministry of jongleury") is a Spanish literature genre from the 12th and 13th centuries, transmitted orally by "juglares" who made their living by telling and singing these stories in public places and palaces while performing short theatrical scenes, acrobatics or other amusements.

These anonymous stories were mostly cantar de gesta. Although versified to make
it easier to memorize, juglares probably often changed the story a little bit as they passed it to others.

There are more theories regarding the origin of these texts. The individualist theory states that these texts
were the creation of one poet and they didn't change much. On the other hand, the traditionalist theory
says that it is a collective work of the public and it was totally changed on its route.

Compared to the Mester de Clerecía the authors weren't educated, treated popular topics, used simple language and the metrics of the verses is irregular.

The most known examples of the works that can be classified as Mester de Juglaría is El Cantar de Mio Cid and Representación de los Reyes Magos.

Medieval literature
Chansons de geste
Spanish literature